Liotti is a surname. Notable people with the surname include:

 Daniele Liotti (born 1971), Italian actor
 Daniele Liotti (born 1994), Italian footballer
 Louis Liotti (born 1985), American ice hockey player

See also
 Piotti